Naganoella is a monotypic moth genus of the family Erebidae erected by Shigero Sugi in 1982. Its only species, Naganoella timandra, was first described by Sergei Alphéraky in 1897. It is found in Korea and Japan.

References

Calpinae
Monotypic moth genera